René Eugène Gateaux (5 May 1889 – 3 October 1914) was a French mathematician. He is principally known for the Gateaux derivative, used in the calculus of variations and in the theory of optimal control. He died in combat during World War I. Paul Lévy produced a posthumous edition of his works, extending them considerably, in his Leçons d'analyse fonctionnelle of 1922.

Life

Early years 
His father had a small saddlery and upholstery business, and his mother was a seamstress. He was schooled at Reims, and in 1907 entered the École normale supérieure (ENS) on the rue d'Ulm. He was well regarded as one of the most promising mathematicians among his peers. During his time at ENS, Gateaux converted to Roman Catholicism.

Schoolteacher 
In 1910, he sat the mathematics examination (being placed 11th of 16 in his year, a somewhat unimpressive result perhaps due to his being so young, according to the ENS's deputy head Émile Borel). He became a teacher at the  lycée in Bar-le-Duc, Meuse in 1912, having completed his two years' military service (the first as a private soldier, and the second as a sub-lieutenant, as was required by a 1905 law concerning the service of students from some Grandes Écoles).

At the same time as he took the post at Bar-le-Duc, he started to work on his thesis about functional analysis, following the work of Vito Volterra and Jacques Hadamard, and its applications to potential theory. Even though it is unknown why Gateaux chose this subject, he may have been encouraged by Hadamard himself, who had just completed a course on the subject at the Collège de France. Among others, in 1911 Paul Lévy had undertaken a brilliant thesis on this type of question, and in 1912  Joseph Pérès, an alumnus of the ENS in the year before Gateaux, had left for Rome to work under Volterra.

Student in Rome 
In 1913, Gateaux asked for, and was awarded, a bursary from the David Weill Foundation to go with him to Rome. Before leaving, he sent a letter to Borel and Volterra, on the subjects they had proposed he work on in Rome. Within it was the theme of integration of real functions in infinite-dimensional space.

He stayed in Rome from October 1913, following Volterra's course and working hard. He published numerous notes in the Rendiconti dell'Accademia dei Lincei, and presented a seminar at the University of Rome. He returned to France in June 1914, intending to return in the September after being awarded a Commercy bursary for another year.

Death in combat 
Gateaux was caught off-guard by mobilisation and the August 1914 declaration of war. He was sent to Toul as a lieutenant in the 269th Infantry Regiment with responsibility for the 2nd Machine Guns section. Having helped defend  Nancy in the Battle of Grand Couronné, his regiment was engaged in the Race to the Sea and sent to Artois. On the morning of 3 October 1914, Gateaux was killed by machine guns at the entrance to the village of Rouvroy, which his regiment was defending. In the confusion of battle, his body was not identified and was quickly interred. Several years later, his remains were exhumed and moved to Neuville-Saint-Vaast National Cemetery, where he was interred in Tomb 76.

Legacy 
In August 1915, Hadamard started the process of awarding Gateaux a Prix de L'Académie des Sciences posthumously. In a letter to Émile Picard, he wrote:

In 1916, Gateaux was awarded the Prix Francoeur. In 1918, Hadamard talked to Paul Lévy, who was responsible for a course on functional analysis at the Collège de France, about drafts Gateaux had left before his departure to the Front. He proposed that Lévy edit them for publication in the Bulletin de la Société Mathématique de France, in two parts. The most important discovery that Lévy found in Gateaux' papers was a draft theory for integrating functions in infinite dimensions. This work came to be of great importance to Lévy in writing his important work Leçons d'analyse fonctionnelle (1922). When Lévy was talking with the American mathematician Norbert Wiener in 1922, Wiener immediately saw that he could use Gateaux' definition to define his "differential space" and construct a measure of Brownian motion (later called a "Wiener measure"). In the foundation article that he published in 1923, Wiener paid homage to Gateaux and Lévy for producing les études les plus profondes sur l'intégration en dimension infinie ("The deepest studies on infinite-dimensional integration").

Publications

Notes

References

External links 

 
 

1889 births
1914 deaths
École Normale Supérieure alumni
People from Vitry-le-François
20th-century French mathematicians
French military personnel killed in World War I
French Army officers